Ernest Bowyer Corbett (7 May 1898 – 15 June 1968) was a New Zealand National Party politician.

Early life and family
Corbett was born in Ōkato in 1898; his father was William Corbett. His mother was descended from Thomas Hansen, who had come to New Zealand with Samuel Marsden in 1814 in the brig Active. He received his education at Puniho pa and at Okato state school. In 1922, he married Doris E. Sharp, the daughter of A. Sharp. He worked for the Post and Telegraph Department for six years, followed by four years in a dairy factory, and then as a dairy farmer.

Public offices

Corbett was the director of the National Dairy Association for six years. He was with the Oxford Dairy Company for 26 years and the Dairy Insurance Company for 12 years. For 12 years, he was a warden for the Church of England.

Corbett held the Egmont electorate from 1943 to 1957. He was Minister of Māori Affairs, Minister of Lands and Minister of Forests in the First National Government. As Māori Affairs Minister he worked closely with Māori statesman Āpirana Ngata, and spent much of his time implementing "Ngata’s policies". In 1953, Corbett was awarded the Queen Elizabeth II Coronation Medal.

Corbett had a deep affection for the natural environment and was an honorary ranger for Egmont National Park. He was made a life member of the Royal Forest and Bird Protection Society of New Zealand. During his time as a cabinet minister, the National Parks Act 1952 was passed. For his contributions, he was awarded the Loder Cup in 1958, an award given to those who have made "contributions to plant conservation work in New Zealand".

Corbett fell ill and, according to Wilson (1985), retired at the end of the parliamentary term on 29 October 1957, or, according to his biographer, in September 1957, shortly before his government's defeat. He died on 15 June 1968.

In April 2010 it was alleged by Muru Walters that in 1956 Corbett told the Māori All Blacks to deliberately lose to the Springboks "for the future of rugby"; however, several other players in the team contradict Walters' accusation and state Corbett never asked them to deliberately throw the game. The Māori team lost 37–0. This was followed by Walters calling for the government to apologise for the way it treated Māori rugby players. 

As Minister he promoted the Māori Purposes Act 1950, which allowed land to be leased compulsorily and sold for arrears of rates. He wrote to Raglan County Council that, "I am firmly of the opinion that if other County Councils take advantage of the provisions of the Act, as your Council is doing, the problem of idle and unproductive Māori land will soon be on its way to a complete solution". The popular left hand break surf access at Waikeri (Manu Bay) was among areas with rate arrears sold to Raglan County Council.

Notes

References

|-

|-

|-

New Zealand National Party MPs
Members of the Cabinet of New Zealand
1898 births
1968 deaths
Rugby union controversies
Māori All Blacks
Members of the New Zealand House of Representatives
New Zealand MPs for North Island electorates
20th-century New Zealand politicians